K. Ganeshan is an Indian film director, producer, screenwriter and actor working in Kannada and Tamil  language films. Ganeshan is known as the director of Porkalathil Oru Poo, a banned film based on the life of Isaipriya, a journalist and television broadcaster for the rebel Liberation Tigers of Tamil Eelam.

Career
K.Ganeshan started his career as an assistant director, later made directorial debut with Asha Jyothi (1993), where he played lead role as well. Apart from Porkalathil Oru Poo (2005), Ganeshan's other notable films are Savi Nilaya, that won Baby Mevisha Karnataka State Film Award for Best Child Actor (Female) in 2015, Namma Magu that was screened at UNESCO IOM and 18.05.2009, based on Sri Lankan Civil War.

Ganeshan's new film is a Tamil film titled as Kadhal Sei with Ilaiyaraaja as composer. The film was dubbed in Kannada as Preethsu.

Filmography

References

External links
     

Living people
Kannada film directors
Tamil film directors
Kannada screenwriters
Film directors from Chennai
Year of birth missing (living people)